Jo Durie and Anne Hobbs of Great Britain were the defending champions, but neither player returned to compete in the doubles in the 1983 tournament.

Billie Jean King and Sharon Walsh won in the final 6–2, 6–4 against Beverly Mould and Elizabeth Sayers.

Seeds
Champion seeds are indicated in bold text while text in italics indicates the round in which those seeds were eliminated.

Draw

Finals

Top half

Bottom half

External links
 ITF Tournament Page
 1983 Edgbaston Cup Doubles Draw

Edgbaston Cup - Doubles, 1983
Doubles